The 1997 Ottawa municipal election was held on November 10, 1997, in Ottawa, Canada. Capital Ward councillor Jim Watson was easily elected mayor over two lesser known candidates. Mayor Jacquelin Holzman did not run for re-election. This would be the last election for the old city of Ottawa. Ottawans also elected members of Regional Council and Regional Chair of the Regional Municipality of Ottawa-Carleton. For those results see 1997 Ottawa-Carleton Regional Municipality elections.

Mayoral race

Results by ward
Watson easily won all 10 wards in the city, but was the weakest in the more Francophone wards of Rideau and Bruyère-Strathcona. His strongest ward was Capital, which he had previously represented on city council.

City council

References

Sources
Ottawa Citizen, November 11, 1997, edition
Ottawa Sun, November 11, 1997, edition

Municipal elections in Ottawa
1997 Ontario municipal elections
1990s in Ottawa
November 1997 events in Canada